Sherrone Moore (born February 3, 1986) is an American football coach and former player who is the offensive coordinator for Michigan Wolverines football team. He played college football as an offensive guard at Oklahoma for coach Bob Stoops from 2006 to 2007. He is a former assistant for Louisville and Central Michigan football teams.

Playing career
Moore is a 2004 graduate of Derby High School in Derby, Kansas.  He played two seasons of junior college football for Butler Community College before transferring to Oklahoma in 2006.  At Oklahoma, Moore appeared in 14 games as an offensive guard.

Moore earned his bachelor's degree in communications from Oklahoma in 2008.

Coaching career

Louisville
Moore joined the Louisville staff as a graduate assistant in 2009 under head coach Steve Kragthorpe, and continued in that role under new head coach Charlie Strong through 2011.  In 2012, he was hired as a full-time assistant, working as tight ends coach through the 2013 season.  

During his time as a graduate assistant, Moore earned a master's degree in sports administration.

Central Michigan
In February 2014, Moore was hired as tight ends coach at Central Michigan by head coach Dan Enos, and in 2015 was retained by new head coach John Bonamego. In 2017, Moore was named assistant head coach and recruiting coordinator in addition to serving as tight ends coach.

Michigan
On January 15, 2018, Moore was hired by the University of Michigan as the new tight ends coach. After three seasons as the tight ends coach, it was announced on January 25, 2021 that Moore would shift from tight ends to become the offensive line coach for the Wolverines, and would add the title of co-offensive coordinator.

Under Moore's leadership, the Michigan offensive line won the Joe Moore Award as the best offensive line in the country in both 2021 and 2022. This is the first time that a school has won the award in back-to-back seasons since the award was established in 2015.

Personal life
Moore and his wife, Kelli, were married in 2015.

References

External links
 Michigan profile

1986 births
Living people
American football offensive guards
Central Michigan Chippewas football coaches
Louisville Cardinals football coaches
Michigan Wolverines football coaches
Oklahoma Sooners football players
University of Louisville alumni
People from Derby, Kansas
Coaches of American football from Kansas
Players of American football from Kansas
African-American coaches of American football
African-American players of American football
20th-century African-American sportspeople
21st-century African-American sportspeople